Herbert Spencer (1820–1903) was an English philosopher, biologist and sociologist.

Herbert Spencer may also refer to:
 Herbert Spencer (graphic designer) (1924–2002), British graphic designer
 Herbert Harvey Spencer (1869–1926), English stuff manufacturer and Liberal Party politician
 Herbert W. Spencer (1905–1992), American film and television composer and orchestrator
 Herbert Lincoln Spencer (1894–1960), president of Bucknell University, 1945–49
 Herbert R. Spencer (1860–1941), professor of obstetric medicine
 Herbert Spencer Elementary School, in New Westminster, British Columbia, Canada